Princess Nina Daniela Menegatto (born Nina Daniela Döbler, 6 November 1978) is a German businesswoman who currently reigns as the head of state of the Principality of Seborga, a micronation encompassing the Italian city of Seborga, from 10 November 2019. 

She is the first woman to hold this position, and is the ex-wife of former head of state Marcello Menegatto.

Life 

Nina was born in Kempten, Bavaria, West Germany on 6 November 1978. She attended the Institut Monte Rosa, and later earned an MBA in marketing from the International University of Monaco. She speaks German, Italian, English, and French fluently. From the early 2000s, Nina has been involved in and supported Seborga, even being elected as Crown Councillor for Foreign Affairs twice, playing a big role in the popularity of Seborga. She has a daughter called Maya (July 2019–).

Princess of Seborga 

Following the abdication of Marcello I, Nina was accepted for candidacy by the Crown Council. She defeated candidate Laura Di Bisceglie (born 3 August 1974 in Sanremo), daughter of the first ruler of Seborga, Giorgio I, with a rating of 122 (63.87%) to 69 (36.13%). Secondo Messali (born 26 August 1955 in Ventimiglia), a guard and former minister of Seborga, was also nominated with little success. The next election is expected to be in 2026, as the monarchy of Seborga is not hereditary and elections are held every seven years (elective monarchy)

On 20 August 2020, she received the official investiture as Princess of Seborga. She is affectionately known as SAS Princess Nina of Seborga (SAS standing for Sua Altezza Serenissima).

See also 

 Principality of Seborga
 Giorgio Carbone
 Marcello Menegatto

References 

1978 births
Seborgan independence activists
Italian princesses
Living people
Micronational leaders
Pretenders
Self-proclaimed monarchy